George Torrey may refer to:
 George Burroughs Torrey, American painter
 George Safford Torrey, American botanist